Sogra is the name of several rural localities in Russia:
Sogra, Kotlassky District, Arkhangelsk Oblast, a village in Votlazhemsky Selsoviet of Kotlassky District in Arkhangelsk Oblast; 
Sogra, Verkhnetoyemsky District, Arkhangelsk Oblast, a village in Gorkovsky Selsoviet of Verkhnetoyemsky District in Arkhangelsk Oblast; 
Sogra, Kostroma Oblast, a selo in Belkovskoye Settlement of Vokhomsky District in Kostroma Oblast; 
Sogra, Omsk Oblast, a village in Serebryansky Rural Okrug of Gorkovsky District in Omsk Oblast;